The men's kumite 55 kilograms competition at the 2006 Asian Games in Doha, Qatar was held on 12 December 2006 at the Qatar SC Indoor Hall.

Schedule
All times are Arabia Standard Time (UTC+03:00)

Results
Legend
K — Won by kiken (8–0)

Main bracket

Repechage

References
Results

External links
Official website

Men's kumite 55 kg